Colfax Township is one of eleven townships in Atchison County, Missouri, United States. As of the 2010 census, its population was 65.

Geography
It contains two cemeteries: London and Prairie Hill.

References

 USGS Geographic Names Information System (GNIS)

External links
 US-Counties.com
 City-Data.com

Townships in Atchison County, Missouri
Townships in Missouri